Treat Conrad Huey and Bobby Reynolds were the defending champions but Huey decided not to participate.
Reynolds played alongside Rik de Voest but they were eliminated in the first round.
Devin Britton and Jeff Dadamo won the final 1–6, 6–2, [10–6] against John Peers and John-Patrick Smith.

Seeds

Draw

Draw

References
 Main Draw

Nielsen Pro Tennis Championship - Doubles
2012 Doubles